The architecture of Ireland is one of the most visible features in the Irish countryside – with remains from all eras since the Stone Age abounding. Ireland is famous for its ruined and intact Norman and Anglo-Irish castles, small whitewashed thatched cottages and Georgian urban buildings. What are unaccountably somewhat less famous are the still complete Palladian and Rococo country houses which can be favourably compared to anything similar in northern Europe, and the country's many Gothic and neo-Gothic cathedrals and buildings.

Despite the oft-times significant British and European influence, the fashion and trends of architecture have been adapted to suit the peculiarities of the particular location. In the late 20th century a new economic climate resulted in a renaissance of Irish culture and design, placing some of Ireland's cities, once again, at the cutting edge of modern architecture.

Pre-Christian Ireland

Grange stone circle is the largest such megalithic construction in Ireland. The earliest date from the Neolithic or late Stone Age. Megalithic tombs are relatively common, with court graves or court tombs being the oldest, some dating back to around 3500 BC. Such tombs consisted of a long chamber, with a large open area (or court) at the entrance. This "court" was generally marked out with standing stones, with the rest of the structure also built in stone.

Passage tombs consisted of a central burial chamber, with a long passageway to the entrance. Again, standing stones were often used for the walls, with slabs of stone over the roof. Newgrange in particular is more interesting in that the inner chamber uses corbelling to span the roof. The chamber and passageway were usually contained in an earthen mound, with the chamber at the centre (Newgrange is again notable in having exterior stonework on the mound). Other notable passage graves are Knowth and Dowth, also in the Boyne Valley near Drogheda.

From some time beginning around the Iron Age, Ireland has thousands of ring forts, or "raths". These consist of an earthen embankment around a central enclosure, sometimes sited on a raised mound. In some cases a souterrain (tunnel) forms part of the structure. These were built also as hill forts depending on the local terrain, or indeed promontory forts. Dún Aengus on the Aran Islands one of the best examples of these forts, which may have been occupied at various times, even in the mediaeval era.

Early Christian Ireland

One feature not usually found outside Ireland is the round tower, such as that at Clonmacnoise in County Offaly or the one on Devenish Island near Enniskillen in County Fermanagh. These were usually built within the monasteries that sprang up all over the island, as the country became the "land of saints and scholars". They were possibly defensive in nature, serving as lookout posts and a place of refuge during an attack (the door to such structures was usually quite high off the ground). Viking raids on Ireland's shores and monasteries were relatively common. St. Cronan's Church in Tuamgraney, County Clare, a pre-Romanesque church which dates from the 10th century, is the oldest church in continuous use in both Ireland and Great Britain.

Eventually some Vikings settled permanently in Ireland, and the main cities were established by the Vikings. Although no buildings from that era are now intact, some street arrangements have their origins in the original Viking layouts. Remains of Viking dwellings have been discovered in many locations, but notably at Wood Quay in Dublin, King John's Castle in Limerick and near Waterford (where what is thought to be the original settlement at Waterford has been uncovered in 2004 during construction of the city's ring road).

Medieval Ireland

After early stone remains, the next most visible features in the Irish countryside are the innumerable castle remains, tower houses and intact castles. Apart from well-known and restored castles such as Bunratty Castle, many unknown remains (particularly of tower houses) exist next to newer farmhouses, or again, simply in fields. Carrickfergus Castle, built by John de Courcy in 1177, as his headquarters after his invasion of Ulster, is the most perfectly preserved Norman castle on the island. The castle at Cahir is also a particularly well-preserved example.

Many fine churches in Ireland were also built during this time, such as St. Canice's Cathedral in Kilkenny and St. Mary's Cathedral in Limerick. Most common was the Romanesque style, as seen at Cormac's Chapel on the Rock of Cashel, and at Clonfert Cathedral in Galway. It was the Normans who brought the Gothic style to Ireland, with such buildings as Christ Church and St. Patrick's Cathedral in Dublin.

Some of Ireland's main cities were built up and fortified before and during the mediaeval period. Limerick remained a walled city until the 18th century, while Derry's medieval walls still stand today. Such features as King John's Castle were built as major fortifications.

Cork and Galway flourished as sea ports, with the establishment of extensive quays in those cities, as well as Limerick and Dublin. Many ancillary buildings were built, such as granaries, storehouses, and early administrative buildings such as custom houses, tholsels and market houses. Some were replaced, rebuilt or removed – many remaining port facilities date from more recent centuries.

The Restoration and after
 
In the decades after the Stuart Restoration, English Baroque architectural styles, including Queen Anne style architecture, were popular in Ireland. This was epitomised by the buildings designed by Sir William Robinson between the 1670s and early 1700s, most notably the Royal Hospital Kilmainham and Marsh's Library. Also notable was Thomas Burgh (1670–1730), the architect of Trinity College Library (1712), Dr Steevens' Hospital (1719) and the Royal Barracks (1702). 

In the early 18th century classical Palladian architecture swept through Ireland, the driving force behind this new fashion was the Irish architect Edward Lovett Pearce. Pearce, born in County Meath in 1699, had studied architecture in Italy, before returning in 1725 to Ireland to oversee, and later, almost, co-design Ireland's first Palladian mansion Castletown House.

Castletown house was a milestone in Irish architecture, designed originally by the Italian Alessandro Galilei, circa 1717, in the manner of an Italian town palazzo, for Ireland's most influential man, the politician Speaker William Conolly, it set a new standard and fashion in Irish architecture. The original architect had returned to Italy before the first stone was laid, subsequently the Irish Pearce was responsible not only for the construction, but modification and improvement to the original plan. From the mid-1720s onwards almost every sizeable building, in Ireland, was cast in the Palladian mould.

 
Through Castletown and his later work, including the Irish Houses of Parliament, Pearce had firmly established many of the Italian architectural concepts in Ireland. Following Pearce's death in 1733, his protégé Richard Cassels (also known as Richard Castle) was to design many of Ireland's finest buildings in a similar, if not more robust, form of Palladian. Many fine country houses were built in the Palladian style around the country by the rich Ascendancy in Ireland. Some, such as Leinster House and Russborough House (illustrated above), were among the finest examples of Palladian architecture. Palladianism in Ireland often differed from that elsewhere in Europe because of the ornate rococo interiors, often with stucco by Robert West and the Lafranchini brothers. Although many of these mansions, such as Pearce and Cassels' joint design Summerhill House, were destroyed in the numerous Irish rebellions, many examples of this unique marrying of the rococo and Palladian still remain today as unique examples of Irish Palladianism.

Elsewhere in Dublin, George Semple built St Patrick's Hospital (1747) and Thomas Cooley the Royal Exchange (1769; now City Hall).

Georgian Ireland

In the later half of the 18th century, one of the most important architects in the country was the London-born James Gandon. Gandon came to Ireland in 1781 at the invitation of Lord Carlow and John Beresford, the Irish commissioner of revenue. Gandon's buildings in Dublin include the Custom House, the Four Courts, the King's Inns and the eastern extension to the Irish parliament building in College Green. By this time the Palladian style had evolved further, and the strict rules of mathematical ratio and axis dictated by Palladio had been all but abandoned. This subsequent evolution is generally referred to as Georgian architecture. It is in this style that large parts of Dublin were rebuilt, causing the city to be referred to as Georgian Dublin.

Francis Johnston was the third great Irish architect of this period. Johnston served as Architect to the Board of Works for a time and was thus responsible for much of the planning of Georgian Dublin. He also left a number of very fine buildings, including St. George's Church, Hardwicke Place and the Viceregal Lodge in the Phoenix Park. This latter now serves as Áras an Uachtaráin, the official residence of the President of Ireland, and is one possible model for the White House in Washington. Leinster House also claims this distinction, and the Neoclassical Castle Coole in County Fermanagh designed by James Wyatt bears an even greater similarity.

In addition to these large-scale buildings, the defining characteristic of Georgian city planning was terraces and squares of elegant family homes. In Ireland, many of these became tenements during the course of the 19th century and a significant proportion were demolished as part of various 20th-century slum clearance programmes. However, many squares and terraces survive in both Dublin and Limerick. Of particular interest are Pery Square in the latter city and Merrion Square in the former. Some smaller towns in Ireland also have Georgian architecture of interest, such as the fine Georgian squares and terraces of Mountmellick, County Laois, and Birr, County Offaly, which is a designated Irish Heritage Town.

Near the end of George III's reign, one of Ireland's most famous Georgian buildings was completed. The GPO was built in 1814 and located on Dublin's main street, O'Connell Street. Designed by Francis Johnston, the building's most striking feature is its hexastyle Ionic portico. Above the building are three statues representing Fidelity, Hibernia and Mercury. The interior is made up largely of a postal hall with a high ceiling. The building has been largely rebuilt since its original construction, mainly due to severe damage incurred in the Easter Rising in 1916.

To enhance the new buildings and cope with larger traffic volumes, the Wide Streets Commission was established in 1757. It bought houses by compulsory purchase to widen streets or to create new ones.

Victorian period

During the 19th century, because all of Ireland was a constituent part of the United Kingdom, British architecture continued to influence building styles in Ireland. Many prominent Irish buildings were designed and built in Ireland during this period (1837–1901), including Findlater's Church on Parnell Square, the Royal City of Dublin Hospital, Olympia Theatre, the Central Markets in Cork, the National Museum of Ireland, the National Library of Ireland, the Natural History Museum, and the National Gallery of Ireland. Many of these new buildings were located in the Southside of Dublin in places like Kildare Street and Baggot Street and in the centre of Cork. An important contributor was the notable English architect, Decimus Burton. He remodelled much of Cobh commissioned by George Brodrick, 5th Viscount Midleton in the 1840s. He was the designer of Martinstown House in Co. Kildare. Prior to that he spent almost two decades renovating the vast neglected public areas of Phoenix Park in Dublin and incidentally designing Dublin Zoo.

However, few buildings were built outside the major cities other than a few railway stations in the provincial towns.

During the Victorian period, many new statues were erected in Ireland, particularly in Dublin, Belfast and Cork. These included several rather elegant statues of figures such as Queen Victoria, Daniel O'Connell and Henry Grattan.

One of Ireland's finest Victorian buildings is the cathedral dedicated to St Mary at Killarney; it is built in a Neo-Gothic style known as 'Lancet-arched Gothic', so called because the cathedral has many long, slender lancet-shaped windows with acutely pointed arches. The architect was August Pugin, one of the greatest of Victorian architects. The cathedral—begun in 1842, funded by public subscription, and interrupted by the horrors of famine—was finally dedicated in 1855. The design is typical of Irish Gothic; it blends Corinthian and Doric orders and is decorated with Sicilian marble and Caen stone. Pugin's work was eminently suited to Ireland. A convert to Roman Catholicism, he believed Gothic architecture to be the only style suitable for religious worship and attacked the earlier Neoclassical architecture as pagan and almost blasphemous. This philosophy embraced by the church in Ireland at the time helped to popularise the Gothic style in Victorian Ireland.

20th century – present

In the 20th century, Irish architecture followed the international trend towards modern, sleek and often radical building styles, particularly after Partition and the independence of most of Ireland as the Irish Free State in the early 1920s. Two major exceptions to this were the Royal College of Science for Ireland (now Government Buildings), on Upper Merrion Street in central Dublin, and Parliament Buildings at Stormont in East Belfast, both built in more traditional architectural styles. New building materials and old were utilised in new ways to maximise style, space, light and energy efficiency. 1928 saw the construction of Ireland's first all concrete Art Deco church in Turner's Cross, Cork. The building was designed by Chicago architect Barry Byrne and met with a cool reception among those more accustomed to traditional designs.

In January 1940 the Art Deco Dublin airport opened, designed by Desmond FitzGerald and the Office of Public Works.

In 1953, one of Ireland's most radical buildings, Bus Éireann's main Dublin terminal building, better known as Busáras was completed. It was built despite huge public opposition, excessive costs (over £1m) and even opposition from the Catholic Church. Michael Scott, its designer, is now considered one of the most important architects of the twentieth century in Ireland – however the original structure has become dilapidated and dated.

One of the main proponents of modernist and Brutalist architecture in Ireland was Sam Stephenson. Stephenson designed the Civic Offices (1979) and the Central Bank of Ireland (1980), both of which generated considerable controversy at the time of their construction. In the same period, Liam McCormick designed the modernist Met Éireann headquarters in Glasnevin, Dublin (1979).

In 1987, the government started to plan what is now known as the IFSC. The complex today houses over 14,000 office workers. One of the most symbolic structures of modern Irish architecture is the Spire of Dublin. Completed in January 2003, the structure was nominated in 2004 for the prestigious Stirling Prize.

A significant change in Ireland's architecture has taken place over the last few years, with a major move from one- and two-story buildings to four-, five-, and six-story apartment and office blocks. There are currently three buildings in planning that would eclipse the island's current tallest building record – held by St John's Cathedral in Limerick – these include the U2 Building, Players Mill and The Tall Building, all of them in Dublin.

Vernacular architecture

The thatched roof cottage and blackhouse have a tradition dating back 9,000 years. Now considered quaint, thatched cottages are often rented out for tourists on holidays. A characteristically exuberant vernacular expression is often found in shopfronts throughout Ireland. Patrick O'Donovan has observed that in the nineteenth century there was "a brilliant explosion" of domestic architecture borne of the opportunities that plate glass, Art Nouveau and classical and gothic themes all offered up at the time. "In Ireland", he wrote, "the villages were not the places where people lived, but where they came for supplies and, most regularly, to attend church. Yet the shops did almost everything that the Church could not do, and offered an alternative, perhaps, to the latter's solemnity."

See also
 Architecture of Limerick
 Georgian Dublin
 Irish Architectural Archive
 List of Irish towns with a Market House
 Listed buildings in Northern Ireland
 Pebbledash
 Sheela na gig an architectural grotesque which adorns numerous ancient buildings.

Notes and references

Bibliography
Becker, Annette, and Wilfried Wang. 20th-century Architecture: Ireland. Prestel: 1997. .
Craig, Maurice. Dublin 1660–1860. Allen Figgis: 1980. .
McParland, Edward. A New Way of Building: Public Architecture in Ireland, 1680–1760. Yale University Press: 2001. .
Dennison, Gabriel, and Baibre Ni Fhloinn. Traditional Architecture in Ireland. Royal Irish Academy: 1994. .
McCullough, Niall. A Lost Tradition: The Nature of Architecture in Ireland. Gandon Editions: 1987. .

External links
Archiseek, Irish Architecture Online
Ireland at the first Lisbon Architectural Triennale (2007)
Details of Arts Council support for architecture in Ireland
Architectural Association of Ireland
Dictionary of Irish Architects
Irish Architecture Foundation
Loving Architecture Festival
Royal Institute of the Architects of Ireland
Civic and Ecclesiastical Architecture of Georgian Dublin Collection. A UCD Digital Library Collection.
Domestic Architecture of Georgian Dublin Collection. A UCD Digital Library Collection.
The Irish Architectural Archive
Urban Design Ireland
The Irish Georgian Society
Ireland at the 10th International Architecture Venice Biennale (2007)
National Inventory of Architectural Heritage – NIAH
The Archaeology of Ancient Ireland (Michael Sundermeier)
Dublin Town Planning Competition 1914. A UCD Digital Library Collection. 
Dataset comprising photographic documentation of 444 buildings in Dublin, Ireland. A UCD Digital Library Collection.
HIBERNIA: Inventories include historical, geographical, and architectural information collected from 1993 to 1995 for 1,280 of Dublin's buildings. A UCD Digital Library Collection.

 
Cultural heritage of Ireland